Grønholt halt is a railway halt near the village of Grønholt near the town of Hillerød in North Zealand, Denmark.

The halt is located on the Little North Line from Helsingør to Hillerød. The train services are currently operated by the railway company Lokaltog which runs frequent local train services between Helsingør station and Hillerød station.

See also
 List of railway stations in Denmark

External links

Lokaltog

Railway stations in the Capital Region of Denmark